ANSP is an acronym for:

 Academic Network at São Paulo
 Academy of Natural Sciences of Philadelphia
 Afghan National Solidarity Programme
 Agency for National Security Planning, a preceding agency of the National Intelligence Service (South Korea)
 Air Navigation Service Provider
 American National Socialist Party
 Aviation, Navigation, and Satellite Programs, Inc.